Khatassy (Xatas) is a rural locality (a selo) under the administrative jurisdiction of the city of republic significance of Yakutsk in the Sakha Republic, Russia. Its population as of the 2010 Census was 4979; down from 3800 recorded in the 2002 Census.

Administrative and municipal status
Within the framework of administrative divisions, the selo of Khatassy, the Urban type settlement of Zhatay and ten other rural localities are subordinated to the city of republic significance of Yakutsk, which is an administrative unit with the status equal to that of the districts. As a municipal division, Khatassy is incorporated as, and is the administrative centre of, Khatassky Rural Settlement.

References

Notes

Sources
Official website of the Sakha Republic. Registry of the Administrative-Territorial Divisions of the Sakha Republic. Yakutsk Urban Okrug. 

Rural localities in Yakutsk
Populated places on the Lena River